The Magallanes Interchange is a four-level partial turbine interchange in Makati, Metro Manila, the Philippines, serving as the junction between the South Luzon Expressway (SLEX), Osmeña Highway, and Epifanio de los Santos Avenue (EDSA). It is also an interchange between the two train lines of Metro Manila, the MRT-3, which is over EDSA, and the PNR Metro Commuter, beside SLEX. It is currently one of the busiest intersections in Metro Manila.

History
After the proposal of President Ferdinand Marcos in 1969 of the creation of 6 Circumferential Roads, EDSA, which used to end at Taft Avenue (Manila South Road), was extended to Roxas Boulevard. Thus, an interchange was required to be built between the then newly built Manila South Diversion Road and EDSA. It opened in 1975 officially as the Manila South Diversion Road–EDSA Interchange.

In 1993, more lighting facilities were installed at the vicinity of the interchange by virtue of an ordinance ratified by the Makati local government. The interchange underwent redevelopment and beautification also by the Makati local government in 2005.

Feared Collapse
The Interchange was poorly designed as it had prior damages on carriageway, particularly cracks and disintegration of concrete, guard rails, and steel expansion joints. Having been repaired in the 1980s, it was one of the most priority structures in Metro Manila that needed retrofitting. however, and in 2010, several pipe leaks were discovered under the interchange, that is why the Metropolitan Manila Development Authority closed down its outer lanes. It was reopened in 2011. The strengthening works at the interchange was completed in 2017.

References

Road interchanges in the Philippines